Antipater of Cyrene (fl. 4th-century BC) was one of the disciples of the philosopher Aristippus, the founder of the Cyrenaic school of philosophy. He had a pupil called Epitimedes of Cyrene. According to Cicero, he was blind, and when some women bewailed the fact, he replied, "What do you mean? Do you think the night can furnish no pleasure?"

Notes

4th-century BC philosophers
Greek blind people
Cyrenaic philosophers
Year of birth unknown
Year of death unknown